S48 may refer to:

Aviation 
 Blériot-SPAD S.48, a French biplane airliner
 Country Squire Airpark in Clackamas County, Oregon, United States
 SABCA S-48, a Belgian aircraft
 Sikorsky S-48, an American helicopter

Other uses 
 S48 (New York City bus) serving Staten Island
 County Route S48 (Bergen County, New Jersey)
 , a submarine of the Royal Navy
 S48: Keep wet with ... (appropriate material to be specified by the manufacturer), a safety phrase
 , a submarine of the United States Navy